This is a list of members of the 50th Legislative Assembly of Queensland from 2001 to 2004, as elected at the 2001 state election held on 17 February 2001.

 On 20 March 2001, the National member for Surfers Paradise and Opposition Leader, Rob Borbidge, resigned. Independent candidate Lex Bell won the resulting by-election on 5 May 2001.
 The member for Darling Downs, Ray Hopper, was elected as an independent, but joined the National Party on 21 December 2001.
 The member for Gympie, Elisa Roberts, was elected as a One Nation member, but resigned from the party on 18 April 2002, and served out the remainder of her term as an independent.
 On 24 March 2003, the Independent member for Maryborough, John Kingston, resigned. Independent candidate Chris Foley won the resulting by-election on 26 April 2003.

See also
2001 Queensland state election
Beattie Ministry (Labor) (1998–2007)

References

Members of Queensland parliaments by term
21st-century Australian politicians